Gustavo Mantuan (born 20 June 2001) is a Brazilian professional footballer who plays as a forward for Russian club Zenit, loaned by Corinthians.

Club career

Corinthians
Mantuan started his career when he was six years old at Corinthians' youth squad, playing futsal until age 13, before changing full time to the football team.

He made his professional debut for Corinthians in a 2020 Campeonato Brasileiro Série A away match against Sport Recife on 24 September 2020.

Loan to Zenit St. Petersburg
On 29 June 2022, Russian champions FC Zenit Saint Petersburg announced an agreement with Corinthians under which Mantuan and Ivan would move on loan to Zenit and Yuri Alberto would be loaned in the opposite direction. On 13 August 2022, he scored his first goal for Zenit, a late winning goal in a 2–1 home win over PFC CSKA Moscow, in his debut game with Zenit.

Career statistics

Personal life 
He is the younger brother of former Corinthians player Guilherme Mantuan.

References

External links

2001 births
Living people
People from Santo André, São Paulo
Brazilian footballers
Association football midfielders
Campeonato Brasileiro Série A players
Russian Premier League players
Sport Club Corinthians Paulista players
FC Zenit Saint Petersburg players
Footballers from São Paulo (state)
Brazilian expatriate footballers
Expatriate footballers in Russia
Brazilian expatriate sportspeople in Russia